Vijaykumar Bheemanna Khandre was an Indian physician and politician belonging to Indian National Congress. He was elected as a member of Karnataka Legislative Assembly from Bhalki in 1989 and 1994. His father Bheemanna Khandre was a Minister of Karnataka Government and his elder brother Eshwara Khandre is serving as Working President of Karnataka Pradesh Congress Committee. He died of cardiac arrest on 29 April 2019 at the age of 60.

References

1950s births
2019 deaths
Indian National Congress politicians
Karnataka MLAs 1989–1994
Karnataka MLAs 1994–1999
Indian National Congress politicians from Karnataka